Nomadic center of 28 tents (also Romanized as Maḥal 28 Chāderhāī ʿAshāīrī) is a village and nomadic center in Momenabad Rural District, in the Central District of Sarbisheh County, South Khorasan Province, Iran. At the 2006 census, its population was 69, in 14 families.

References 

Populated places in Sarbisheh County